Embún is a locality located in the municipality of Valle de Hecho, in Huesca province, Aragon, Spain. As of 2020, it has a population of 104.

Geography 
Embún is located 99km north-northwest of Huesca.

References

Populated places in the Province of Huesca